Monte Grande is a city in Buenos Aires Province, Argentina.

Monte Grande may also refer to:

Populated places
Monte Grande, part of Ciudad del Plata, San José Department, Uruguay
Monte Grande, Michoacán, a rancho in Michoacán state, Mexico
Monte Grande (Fogo), a settlement on the island of Fogo, Cape Verde
Monte Grande, Cabo Rojo, Puerto Rico

Mountains
Monte Grande (Sal), on the island of Sal, Cape Verde

Geology
Monte Grande Formation, a Mesozoic geologic formation in Spain

See also
Montegrande (archaeological site) in Peru
, Bronze Age archaeological site in Sicily